The Paralympic Games or Paralympics, also known as the Games of the Paralympiad, is a periodic series of international multisport events involving athletes with a range of physical disabilities. There are Winter and Summer Paralympic Games, which since the 1988 Summer Olympics in Seoul, South Korea, are held almost immediately following the respective Olympic Games. All Paralympic Games are governed by the International Paralympic Committee (IPC).

The Paralympics has grown from a small gathering of British World War II veterans in 1948 to one of the largest international sporting events by the early 21st century. The Paralympics has grown from 400 athletes with a disability from 23 countries in Rome 1960, where they were proposed by doctor Antonio Maglio, to 4,520 athletes from 163 National Paralympic Committees at the 2020 Summer Paralympics. Paralympians strive for equal treatment with non-disabled Olympic athletes, but there is a large funding gap between Olympic and Paralympic athletes.

The Paralympic Games are organized in parallel with and in a similar way to the Olympic Games. The IOC-recognized Special Olympics World Games include athletes with intellectual disabilities (although since 1992, intellectually disabled people also participate in the Paralympic Games), and the Deaflympics held since 1924 are exclusive for deaf athletes.

Given the wide variety of disabilities that Para athletes have, there are several categories in which the athletes compete. The allowable disabilities are broken down into ten eligible impairment types. These are impaired muscle power, impaired passive range of movement, limb deficiency, leg length difference, short stature, hypertonia, ataxia, athetosis, vision impairment and intellectual impairment. These categories are further broken down into various classifications.

Forerunners

Disabled athletes at the Olympic Games 
Athletes with disabilities did compete at the Olympic Games prior to the advent of the Paralympics. The first athlete to do so was German-American gymnast George Eyser in 1904, who had one artificial leg. Olivér Halassy, a Hungarian amputee water polo player who competed in three successive Olympic Games, beginning in 1928. Hungarian Károly Takács competed in shooting events in both the 1948 and 1952 Summer Olympics. He was a right-arm amputee and could shoot left-handed. Another disabled athlete who appeared in the Olympics prior to the Paralympic Games was Lis Hartel, a Danish equestrian athlete who had contracted polio in 1943 and won a silver medal in the dressage event in the 1952 Summer Olympics.

Stoke Mandeville Games 
The first organized athletic event for disabled athletes that coincided with the Olympic Games took place on the day of the opening of the 1948 Summer Olympics in London. German-Jewish Dr Ludwig Guttmann of Stoke Mandeville Hospital, who had fled Nazi Germany with the help of the Council for Assisting Refugee Academics (CARA) in 1939, hosted a sports competition for British World War II veteran patients with spinal cord injuries. The first games were called the 1948 International Wheelchair Games, and were intended to coincide with the 1948 Olympics. Guttman's aim was to create an elite sports competition for people with disabilities that would be equivalent to the Olympic Games. The games were held at the same location each year, and in 1952 Dutch and Israeli veterans took part alongside the British, making it the first international competition of its own kind. In 1960, the 9th annual games took place outside of the UK for the first time in Rome, to coincide with the 1960 Summer Olympics which were also being held in Rome. These were to be later designated the 1st Paralympic Games. These early competitions have been described as the precursors of the Paralympic Games, and Stoke Mandeville holds a similar place in the lore of the Paralympic movement as Greece holds in the Olympic.

Milestones

There have been several milestones in the Paralympic movement. The first official Paralympic Games, coincident with the ninth Stoke Mandeville Games but no longer open solely to war veterans, was held in Rome in 1960. They were the brainchild of Dr. Antonio Maglio, a friend and follower of Dr. Guttmann and were financed almost entirely by Dr. Maglio's employer, the Workers National Accident Insurance Fund of Italy, then led by Renato Morelli, who was also Chairman of the International Social Security Association. Four hundred athletes from 23 countries competed at the 1960 Games. Since 1960, the Paralympic Games have taken place in the same year as the Olympic Games. The Games were initially open only to athletes in wheelchairs; at the 1976 Summer Games, athletes with different disabilities were included for the first time at a Summer Paralympics. With the inclusion of more disability classifications the 1976 Summer Games expanded to 1,600 athletes from 40 countries. The 1988 Summer Paralympics in Seoul was another milestone for the Paralympic movement. It was in Seoul that the Paralympic Summer Games were held directly after the 1988 Summer Olympics, in the same host city, and using the majority of the venues. This set a precedent that was followed in 1992, 1996 and 2000. It was eventually formalized in an agreement between the International Paralympic Committee (IPC) and the International Olympic Committee (IOC) in 2001, and was extended through 2020. On March 10, 2018, the two committees further extended their contract to 2032. Despite being held in the same region, the 1992 Winter Paralympics used different competition venues than those used for the Olympic Games. 1994 Winter Paralympics were the first Winter Games to use the same venues and had the same Organizing Committee as the Winter Olympics.

Winter Games

The first Winter Paralympic Games were held in 1976 in Örnsköldsvik, Sweden. This was the first Paralympics in which multiple categories of athletes with disabilities could compete. The Winter Games were celebrated every four years on the same year as their summer counterpart, just as the Olympics were. This tradition was upheld through the 1992 Games in Albertville, France; after that, beginning with the 1994 Games, the Winter Paralympics and the Winter Olympics have been held in those even-numbered years separate from the Summer Olympics.

International Paralympic Committee

The International Paralympic Committee is the global governing body of the Paralympic Movement. It comprises 176 National Paralympic Committees (NPC) and four disability-specific international sports federations. The president of the IPC is Andrew Parsons. The IPC's international headquarters are in Bonn, Germany. The IPC is responsible for organizing the Summer and Winter Paralympic Games. It also serves as the International Federation for nine sports (Paralympic athletics, Paralympic swimming, Paralympic archery, Paralympic powerlifting, Para-alpine skiing, Paralympic biathlon, Paralympic cross-country skiing, ice sledge hockey and Wheelchair DanceSport). This requires the IPC to supervise and coordinate the World Championships and other competitions for each of the nine sports it regulates. IPC membership also includes National Paralympic Committees  and international sporting federations. International Federations are independent sport federations recognized by the IPC as the sole representative of a Paralympic Sport. International Federations responsibilities include technical jurisdiction and guidance over the competition and training venues of their respective sports during the Paralympic Games. The IPC also recognizes media partners, certifies officials, judges, and is responsible for enforcing the bylaws of the Paralympic Charter.

The IPC has a cooperative relationship with the International Olympic Committee (IOC). Delegates of the IPC are also members of the IOC and participate on IOC committees and commissions. The two governing bodies remain distinct, with separate Games, despite the close working relationship.

The Paralympic Games were designed to emphasize the participants' athletic achievements and not their disability. Recent games have emphasized that these games are about ability and not disability. The movement has grown dramatically since its early days – for example, the number of athletes participating in the Summer Paralympic games has increased from 400 athletes in Rome in 1960 to 4,342 athletes from 159 countries in Rio de Janeiro in 2016. Both the Paralympic Summer and Winter Games are recognized on the world stage.

Unlike the Olympic Games, English is the official language of the Paralympic movement. The other language used at each Paralympic Games is the official languages of the host country. Every proclamation (such as the announcement of each country during the parade of nations in the opening ceremony) is spoken in these two languages.

Name and symbols

Although the name was originally coined as a portmanteau combining paraplegic (due to its origins as games for people with spinal injuries) and Olympic, the inclusion of other disability groups meant that this was no longer considered very accurate. The present formal explanation for the name is that it derives from the Greek preposition ,  ('beside' or 'alongside') and thus refers to a competition held in parallel with the Olympic Games. The Summer Games of 1988 held in Seoul was the first time the term Paralympic came into official use.

"Spirit in Motion" is the current motto for the Paralympic movement. The current Paralympic flag is used since 2020 and contains three colours, red, blue, and green, which are the colours most widely represented in the flags of nations. The colours are each in the shape of an Agito (which is Latin for 'I move/I shake/I stir'), which is the name given to an asymmetrical crescent specially designed for the Paralympic movement. The three Agitos circle a central point, which is a symbol for the athletes congregating from all points of the globe. The motto and symbol of the IPC were changed in 2003 to their current versions. The change was intended to convey the idea that Paralympians have a spirit of competition and that the IPC as an organization realizes its potential and is moving forward to achieve it. The vision of the IPC is, "To enable Paralympic athletes to achieve sporting excellence and to inspire and excite the world." The Paralympic anthem is "Hymne de l'Avenir" or "Anthem of the Future". It was composed by Thierry Darnis and adopted as the official anthem in March 1996.

Ceremonies

Opening

As mandated by the Paralympic Charter, various elements frame the opening ceremony of the Paralympic Games. Most of these rituals were established at the 1920 Summer Olympics in Antwerp and were shared with the Olympic Games. The ceremony typically starts with the hoisting of the host country's flag and a performance of its national anthem. Unlike the Olympic Games, immediately after the national anthem the athletes parade into the stadium grouped by nation. Since the 1960 Summer Paralympics, the nations enter the stadium alphabetically according to the host country's or region official language, though with the host country's athletes being the last to enter. The host nation presents artistic displays of music, singing, dance, and theatre representative of its culture.

Speeches are given, formally opening the games. Finally, the Paralympic flame is brought into the stadium and passed on until it reaches the final torch carrier—often a Paralympic athlete from the host nation—who lights the Paralympic flame in the stadium's cauldron.

Closing
The closing ceremony of the Paralympic Games takes place after all sporting events have concluded. Flag-bearers from each participating country enter, followed by the athletes who enter together, without any national distinction.
The Paralympic flag is taken down. Since the 1988 Winter Paralympics, with some exceptions, the national flag of the country hosting the next Summer or Winter Paralympic Games is hoisted while the corresponding national anthem is played. The games are officially closed, and the Paralympic flame is extinguished. After these compulsory elements, the next host nation briefly introduces itself with artistic displays of dance and theater representative of its culture.

Medal presentation

A medals ceremony is held after the conclusion of each Paralympic event. The winner, second and third-place competitors or teams stand on top of a three-tiered rostrum when they are awarded their respective medal by an IPC member. The national flags of the medalists are then raised while the national anthem of the gold medalist is played. Volunteering citizens of the host country also act as hosts during the medal ceremonies, as they aid the officials who present the medals and act as flag-bearers. For every Paralympic event, the respective medal ceremony is held, at most, one day after the event's final.

Equality

Relationship with the Olympics
After a troubled relation until the 1996 Summer Paralympics and a successful 2000 Summer Paralympics. In June 2001, the International Olympic Committee (IOC) and the International Paralympic Committee (IPC) signed an agreement that would ensure that the staging of the Paralympic Games is automatically included in the bid for the Olympic Games. The agreement came into effect at the 2008 Paralympic Summer Games in Beijing, and the 2010 Paralympic Winter Games in Vancouver. However, the Salt Lake 2002 Organizing Committee (SLOC), chose to follow the practice of "one bid, one city" already at the 2002 Games in Salt Lake City, with one Organizing Committee for both Games, which was followed up by the 2004 Summer Games in Athens. The agreement was adjusted in 2003. An extension was signed in June 2006, after some troubles at 2006 Winter Paralympics. Initially agreed to remain in effect until the 2012 Summer Olympics, this has since been extended,  encompassing all Summer and Winter games up until the 2020 Summer Olympics. Even beyond this, all Summer and Winter host cities currently announced are preparing pairs of Olympic and Paralympics Games. This was further confirmed when on 10 March 2018, the IOC and the IPC agreed to further extend the contract to the 2032 Summer Olympics.

The IOC has written its commitment to equal access to athletics for all people into its charter, which states,
While the charter is silent on discrimination specifically related to disability; given the language in the charter regarding discrimination it is reasonable to infer that discrimination on the basis of disability would be against the ideals of the Olympic Charter and the IOC. This is also consistent with the Paralympic Charter, which forbids discrimination on the basis of political, religious, economic, disability, gender, sexual orientation or racial reasons.

Chairman of the London organising committee, Sebastian Coe, said about the 2012 Summer Paralympics and 2012 Summer Olympics in London, England, that, "We want to change public attitudes towards disability, celebrate the excellence of Paralympic sport and to enshrine from the very outset that the two Games are an integrated whole."

The 2014 Winter Paralympic Games is the first such Paralympics hosted by Russia. Russia ratified the UN Convention on the Rights of Persons with Disabilities during that period. Notably at 2010 Vancouver, their Paralympic team topped the medal table at the Winter Paralympics, while their Olympic team performed well below expectations at the Winter Olympics. This led the media to highlight the contrast between the achievements of the country's Olympic and Paralympic delegations, despite the greater attention and funding awarded to the Olympic athletes. The Russian Federation organizers of the 2014 Winter Paralympic Games have, since 2007, made efforts to make the host city Sochi more accessible.

Paralympians at the Olympics

Paralympic athletes have sought equal opportunities to compete at the Olympic Games. The precedent was set by Neroli Fairhall, a Paralympic archer from New Zealand, who competed at the 1984 Summer Olympics in Los Angeles.
In 2008, Oscar Pistorius, a South African sprinter, attempted to qualify for the 2008 Summer Olympics. Pistorius had both his legs amputated below the knee and races with two carbon fibre blades manufactured by Össur. He holds Paralympic world record in the 400 meter event. 
Pistorius missed qualifying for the 2008 Summer Olympics in the 400 meter race, by 0.70 seconds. He qualified for the 2008 Summer Paralympics where he won gold medals in the 100, 200, and 400 meter sprints. In 2011, Pistorius qualified for the 2012 Summer Olympics and competed in two events: he made the semi-final in the 400 metres race; and his team came 8th in the final of the 4 × 400 metres relay race. Even though all athletes are given equal opportunities to participate in these events, such as the 400 meter race, there has been growing criticism that the games may not be fair to all athletes. For example, athletes running a race with a left prosthetic leg may be disadvantaged compared to those with a right side prosthesis because the races are run in an anticlockwise direction, giving some athletes an advantage.

Some athletes without a disability also compete at the Paralympics; The sighted guides for athletes with a visual impairment are such a close and essential part of the competition that the athlete with visual impairment and the guide are considered a team, and both athletes are medal candidates.

Funding
Starting at the 1992 Summer Paralympics, recent games have also been supported by contributions from major sponsors. Unlike the Olympics, where the IOC mandates that arenas be clean of sponsor logos, the Paralympics do allow the logos of official sponsors to be displayed inside arenas and on uniforms.

Media coverage
While the Olympic Games have experienced tremendous growth in global media coverage since the 1984 Summer Paralympics, the Paralympics have been unable to maintain a consistent international media presence.

Television broadcasts of Paralympic Games began in 1976, but this early coverage was confined to taped-delay releases to one nation or region. At the 1992 Summer Paralympics, there were 45 hours of live coverage but it was available only in Europe. Other countries broadcast highlight packages during the Games. No meaningful improvements in coverage occurred until the 2000 Summer Paralympics in Sydney.

The 2000 Paralympics represented a significant increase in global media exposure for the Paralympic Games. A deal was reached between the Sydney Paralympic Organizing Committee (SPOC) and All Media Sports (AMS) to broadcast the Games internationally. Deals were reached with Asian, South American, and European broadcast companies to distribute coverage to as many markets as possible. The Games were also webcast for the first time. Because of these efforts, the Sydney Paralympics reached a global audience estimated at 300 million people. Also significant was the fact that the organizers did not have to pay networks to televise the Games as had been done at the 1992 and 1996 Games. Despite these advances, consistent media attention has been a challenge, which was evidenced in the coverage in Great Britain of the 2010 Winter Paralympics.

In the UK, it is a legal requirement for the games to be broadcast live by a free-to-air broadcaster, although a pay-to-view broadcaster can share the rights; the British Broadcasting Corporation (BBC) was criticized for its minimal coverage of the 2010 Winter Paralympics as compared to its coverage of the 2010 Winter Olympics. The BBC announced it would stream some content on its website and show a one-hour highlight program after the Games ended. For the Winter Olympics the BBC aired 160 hours of coverage. The response from the BBC was that budget constraints and the "time zone factor" necessitated a limited broadcast schedule. The reduction in coverage was done in spite of increased ratings for the 2008 Summer Paralympics, which was watched by 23% of the population of Great Britain. In Norway, the Norwegian Broadcasting Corporation (NRK) broadcast 30 hours of the 2010 Winter Games live. NRK-sport were critical of parts of the TV production from Vancouver, and notified the EBU of issues such as the biathlon coverage excluding the shooting, and cross-country skiing with skiers in the distance, making it hard to follow the progress of the competition. NRK were far more pleased with the production of the ice sledge hockey and wheelchair curling events, which they felt reached the same level as the Olympic Games. Private broadcaster Channel 4 acquired the rights to the Paralympics in the United Kingdom for the 2012 Summer Paralympics, and planned to air extensive coverage of the games; Channel 4 aired 150 hours of coverage, and also offered mobile apps, and three dedicated streaming channels of additional coverage on Sky, Freesat, Virgin Media and Channel 4's website." Channel 4 also made a push to heighten the profile of the Paralympics in the country by producing a two minute trailer for its coverage, "Meet the Superhumans"; which premièred simultaneously on over 70 commercial channels in the UK on 17 July 2012. Channel 4 have also acquired the rights to the 2014 Winter Paralympics and the 2016 Summer Paralympics.

Outside the Games
A 2010 study by the University of British Columbia (UBC) on the Olympic Games Impact (OGI), showed that of roughly 1,600 Canadian respondents, 41 to 50 percent believed the 2010 Paralympic and Olympic Games in Vancouver, British Columbia, Canada, triggered additional accessibility of buildings, sidewalks and public spaces. 23 percent of employers said the Games had increased their willingness to hire people with disabilities.

Chief Executive Officer for the International Paralympic Committee Xavier Gonzalez said about the 2008 Summer Paralympics in Beijing, China, that:

Classification

The International Paralympic Committee (IPC) has established ten disability categories. Athletes are divided within each category according to their level of impairment, in a functional classification system which differs from sport to sport.

Categories
The IPC has established ten disability categories, including physical, visual, and intellectual impairment. Athletes with one of these disabilities can compete in the Paralympics, though not every sport can allow for every disability category. These categories apply to both Summer and Winter Paralympics.

Physical Impairment – There are eight different types of physical impairment:
 Impaired muscle power – With impairments in this category, the force generated by muscles, such as the muscles of one limb, one side of the body or the lower half of the body is reduced, (e.g. spinal cord injury, spina bifida, post-polio syndrome).
 Impaired passive range of movement – The range of movement in one or more joints is reduced in a systematic way. Acute conditions such as arthritis are not included.
 Loss of limb or limb deficiency – A total or partial absence of bones or joints from partial or total loss due to illness, trauma, or congenital limb deficiency (e.g., dysmelia).
 Leg-length difference – Significant bone shortening occurs in one leg due to congenital deficiency or trauma.
 Short stature – Standing height is reduced due to shortened legs, arms and trunk, which are due to a musculoskeletal deficit of bone or cartilage structures. (e.g., achondroplasia, growth hormone deficiency, osteogenesis imperfecta)
Hypertonia – Hypertonia is marked by an abnormal increase in muscle tension and reduced ability of a muscle to stretch. Hypertonia may result from injury, disease, or conditions which involve damage to the central nervous system (e.g., cerebral palsy).
Ataxia – Ataxia is an impairment that consists of a lack of coordination of muscle movements (e.g., cerebral palsy, Friedreich's ataxia, multiple sclerosis).
Athetosis – Athetosis is generally characterized by unbalanced, involuntary movements and a difficulty maintaining a symmetrical posture (e.g., cerebral palsy, choreoathetosis).

Visual impairment – Athletes with visual impairment ranging from partial vision, sufficient to be judged legally blind, to total blindness. This includes impairment of one or more component of the visual system (eye structure, receptors, optic nerve pathway, and visual cortex). The sighted guides for athletes with a visual impairment are such a close and essential part of the competition that the athlete with visual impairment and the guide are considered a team. Beginning in 2012, these guides along with sighted goalkeepers in 5-a-side football became eligible to receive medals of their own.

Intellectual Disability – Athletes with a significant intellectual impairment and associated limitations in adaptive behaviour. The IPC primarily serves athletes with physical disabilities, but the disability group Intellectual Disability has been added to some Paralympic Games. This includes only elite athletes with intellectual disabilities diagnosed before the age of 18. However, the IOC-recognized Special Olympics World Games are open to all people with intellectual disabilities.

Classification system

Within the disability categories, the athletes still need to be divided according to level of impairment. The classification systems differ from sport to sport and are intended to open up sports to as many athletes as possible who can participate in fair competitions against athletes with similar levels of ability. The biggest challenge in the classification system is how to account for the wide variety and severity of disabilities. Consequently, there is a range of impairment within most classifications.

Medical classification (until the 1980s)
From its inception until the 1980s, the Paralympic system for classifying athletes consisted of a medical evaluation and diagnosis of impairment. An athlete's medical condition was the only factor used to determine what class they competed in. For example, an athlete who had a spinal cord injury that resulted in lower limb paresis, would not compete in the same wheelchair race as an athlete with a double above-knee amputation. The fact that their disability caused the same impairment did not factor into classification determination, the only consideration was their medical diagnosis. It was not until views on disabled athletics shifted from just a form of rehabilitation to an end in itself, that the classification system changed from medical diagnosis to a focus on the functional abilities of the athlete.

Functional classification (since the 1980s)

While there is no clear date when the shift occurred, a functional classification system became the norm for disabled athletic classification in the 1980s. In a functional system, the focus is on what effect the athlete's impairment has on his or her athletic performance. Under this system, athletes with total loss of function in their legs will compete together in most sports, because their functional loss is the same and the reason for the loss is immaterial. The only exception to the functional system is the classification format used by International Blind Sports Federation (IBSA), which still uses a medically based system.

Some sports are only held for certain disability types. For example, goalball is only for visually impaired athletes. The Paralympics recognizes three different grades of visual impairment, consequently all competitors in goalball must wear a visor or "black out mask" so that athletes with less visual impairment will not have an advantage. Other sports, like athletics, are open to athletes with a wide variety of impairments. In athletics, participants are broken down into a range of classes based on the disability they have and then they are placed in a classification within that range based on their level of impairment. For example: classes 11–13 are for visually impaired athletes, which class they are in depends on their level of visual impairment. 
There are also team competitions such as wheelchair rugby. Members of the team are each given a point value based on their activity limitation. A lower score indicates a more severe activity limitation than a higher score. A team cannot have more than a certain maximum total of points on the field of play at the same time to ensure equal competition. For example, in wheelchair rugby, the four players' combined disability number must total no more than eight points.

Sports

There are twenty-two sports on the Summer Paralympic program and six sports on the Winter Paralympics program. Within some of the sports are several events. For example, alpine skiing has downhill, super combined, super-G, slalom, giant slalom. The IPC has governance over several of the sports but not all of them. Other international organizations, known as International Sports Federations (IF), notably the International Wheelchair and Amputee Sports Federation (IWAS), the International Blind Sports Federation (IBSA), and the Cerebral Palsy International Sports and Recreation Association (CP-ISRA), govern some sports that are specific to certain disability groups. There are national chapters for these International Sport Federations including National Paralympic Committees, which are responsible for recruitment of athletes and governance of sports at the national level.

Cheating

After the 2000 Sydney games, a Spanish basketball player alleged that several members of the gold medal-winning Spanish basketball intellectually disabled (ID) team were not disabled. He claimed that only two athletes out of the twelve-member team met the qualifications of an intellectually disabled athlete. A controversy ensued and the International Paralympic Committee (IPC) called on the Spanish National Paralympic Committee to launch an investigation. The investigation uncovered several Spanish athletes who had flouted the ID rules. In an interview with the president of the federation that oversees ID competition, Fernando Martín Vicente admitted that athletes around the world were breaking the ID eligibility rules. The IPC responded by starting an investigation of its own. The results of the IPC's investigation confirmed the Spanish athlete's allegations and also determined that the incident was not isolated to the basketball ID event or to Spanish athletes. As a result, all ID competitions were suspended indefinitely. The ban was lifted after the 2008 Games after work had been done to tighten the criteria and controls governing admission of athletes with intellectual disabilities. Four sports, swimming, athletics, table tennis and rowing, were anticipated to hold competitions for ID athletes at the 2012 Summer Paralympics.

The Paralympics have also been tainted by steroid use. At the 2004 games in Athens, Irish born paralympic rower Dylan O'Flaherty was banned after testing positive for a multitude of performance enhancing drugs. O'Flaherty died of an overdose later that night after allegedly taking all of the remaining substances he had managed to smuggle into the Paralympic village with him. At the 2008 Games in Beijing, three powerlifters and a German basketball player were banned after having tested positive for banned substances. This was a decrease in comparison to the ten powerlifters and one track athlete who were banned from the 2000 Games. German skier Thomas Oelsner became the first Winter Paralympian to test positive for steroids. He had won two gold medals at the 2002 Winter Paralympics, but his medals were stripped after his positive drug test. At the 2010 Winter Paralympics in Vancouver, Swedish curler Glenn Ikonen tested positive for a banned substance and was suspended for six months by the IPC. He was removed from the rest of the curling competition but his team was allowed to continue. The 54-year-old curler said his doctor had prescribed a medication on the banned substances list.

Another concern now facing Paralympic officials is the technique of "boosting". Athletes can artificially increase their blood pressure, often by self-harming, which has been shown to improve performance by up to 15%. This is most effective in the endurance sports such as cross-country skiing. To increase blood pressure athletes will deliberately cause trauma to limbs below a spinal injury. This trauma can include breaking bones, strapping extremities in too tightly, and using high-pressure compression stockings. The injury is painless but it does affect the athlete's blood pressure.

Another potential concern is the use of gene therapy among Paralympic athletes. All Paralympic athletes are banned from enhancing their abilities through gene doping, but it is extremely difficult to differentiate these concepts. The World Anti-Doping Agency (WADA) is currently researching both gene doping and gene therapy, in part to discern the boundary between the two closely related concepts.

The IPC have been working with WADA since 2003, to ensure compliance with WADA's anti-doping code among its Paralympic athletes. The IPC has also promised to continue increasing the number of athletes tested at each of its Games, in order to further minimize the possible effect of doping in Paralympic sports. Mandatory in- and out-of competition testing has also been implemented by the IPC to further ensure all of its athletes are performing in compliance with WADA regulations.

Having sent samples for forensic analysis, the IPC found evidence that the prevalent doping by Russian athletes was in operation at the 2014 Winter Paralympics in Sochi. On 7 August 2016, the IPC's Governing Board voted unanimously to ban the entire Russian team from the 2016 Summer Paralympics, citing the Russian Paralympic Committee's inability to enforce the IPC's Anti-Doping Code and the World Anti-Doping Code which is "a fundamental constitutional requirement". IPC President Sir Philip Craven stated that the Russian government had "catastrophically failed its Para athletes". IPC Athletes' Council Chairperson and CPC Member Todd Nicholson said that Russia had used athletes as "pawns" in order to "show global prowess".

Notable champions and achievements

Trischa Zorn of the United States is the most decorated paralympian in history. She competed in the blind swimming events and won a total of 55 medals, 41 of which are gold. Her Paralympic career spanned 24 years from 1980 to 2004. She was also an alternate on the 1980 American Olympic swim team, but did not go to the Olympics due to a boycott by the United States and several of its allies. Ragnhild Myklebust of Norway holds the record for the most medals ever won at the Winter Paralympic Games. Competing in a variety of events between 1988 and 2002, she won a total of 22 medals, of which 17 were gold. After winning five gold medals at the 2002 Games she retired at the age of 58. Neroli Fairhall, a paraplegic archer from New Zealand, was the first paraplegic competitor, and the third Paralympian, to participate in the Olympic Games, when she competed in the 1984 Summer Olympics in Los Angeles. She placed thirty-fourth in the Olympic archery competition, and won a Paralympic gold medal in the same event.

Host cities

Postponed to 2021, due to the COVID-19 pandemic, marking the first time that the Paralympic Games has been postponed. They are still called the 2020 Summer Paralympics, even with the change in scheduling to one year later. The Games were held from 24 August to 5 September 2021.

See also
 
 All-time Paralympic Games medal table
 Parapan American Games
 Asian Para Games
 Commonwealth Paraplegic Games
 Cybathlon
 Disability flag

Notes

References

Further reading
 Peterson, Cynthia and Robert D. Steadward. Paralympics : Where Heroes Come, 1998, One Shot Holdings, .
 Thomas and Smith, Disability, Sport and Society, Routledge, 2008, .

External links

 Official website
 Paralympic Sport TV, web-TV channel of the International Paralympic Committee (IPC)

Paralympic Games
Disabled multi-sport events
Recurring sporting events established in 1960